Valea Lungă is a commune in Dâmbovița County, Muntenia, Romania with a population of 5,054 people. It is composed of ten villages: Băcești, Izvoru, Moșia Mică, Șerbăneasa, Ștubeie Tisa, Valea lui Dan, Valea Lungă-Cricov (the commune center), Valea Lungă-Gorgota, Valea Lungă-Ogrea and Valea Mare.

References

Communes in Dâmbovița County
Localities in Muntenia